Mandi is a patwar circle and village in Phagi Tehsil in Jaipur district, Rajasthan. Mandi is also patwar circles for nearby villages, Mohanpura Ranwa and Rampura Railway.

In Mandi, there are 138 households with total population of 999 (with 53.05% males and 46.95% females), based on 2011 census. Total area of village is 9.19 km2.  There is one primary school in Mandi village.

References

Villages in Jaipur district